LBS or lbs may refer to:

Science and technology
 Plural abbreviation for the pound unit of mass
 Location-based service, software service using geographical location

Organisations
 , member banks of the Sparkassen-Finanzgruppe
 Lauder Business School, Vienna, Austria
 Lease Buyback Scheme, Singapore
 Lekki British School, Nigeria
 Lexington Broadcast Services Company, a former television production and syndication company
 Liberia Broadcasting System, a state-owned radio and television network
 Liverpool Business School, England
 London Business School, of the University of London, England
 Louise Brooks Society, a film star fan club

Other uses
 Lal Bahadur Shastri, (1904-1966), former Prime Minister of India
 Legendary Banked Slalom, a snowboard race, Washington State, US
 Local bike shop, a small business
 London Borough of Southwark, UK
 London Borough of Sutton, UK